Samuël Adebiyi, better known by his stage name Féfé (formerly Féniksi), is a French singer and rapper.

Early life and career
Féfé was born in Clichy, Hauts-de-Seine, France on 18 January 1976 to Yoruba parents from Nigeria. He formed the rap group OFX with KLR in 1996 where Adebiyi was known as PHNX (also read as Féniksi). The two released the maxi Je n'ose y croire, after which a third member Vicelow joined in. The trio made a number of appearances on various compilations and mixtapes. KLR died in April 1998.

OFX including Féniksi became part of a bigger formation, the hip hop collective Saïan Supa Crew, that besides OFX, included two other formations, Explicit Samouraï and Simple Spirit. After KLR's death, Saïan Supa Crew released an album titled KLR in his memory in 1999. In 2002, OFX released the maxi OVNI 2. It was followed by another OFX album, Roots in 2003. In its turn, Saïan Supa Crew would release X-Raisons in 2001 and Hold-Up in 2005.

OFX eventually faded and is no longer active. Its remaining member Féfé has continued his career with solo releases like Jeune à la retraite released on Polydor on 12 October 2009, and on 20 May 2013, his second solo album Le charme des premiers jours again on Polydor.

In popular culture
He co-wrote "Le malade imaginaire", a main song in the soundtrack of the 2002 film The Truth About Charlie, in addition to co-writing the track "Intro".

In 2010, he sang the French version of "Wavin' Flag", the Coca-Cola-sponsored 2010 World Cup song. Féfé sang the French lyrics with songwriter, the Somalian-Canadian K'naan performing the English lyrics. The Féfé version credit to "K'naan featuring Féfé" reached number 2 on SNEP, the official French Singles Chart.
In 2011, he performed with Aṣa in Sydney.

Discography

Albums, maxis, mixtapes
as part of OFX
1999: Je n'ose y croire
2002; OVNI 2
2003: Roots
as part of collective Saïan Supa Crew
1997: Saïan Supa Land (EP)
1998: Saïan Supa Crew (EP)
1999: KLR (album)
2000: L'Block presente (EP)
2001: X-Raisons (album)
2002: Da Stand Out (Ep)
2005: Hold-Up (album)
2006: Hold Up Tour – Live in Paris (live album)
solo albums

Singles
Featured in

References

External links
Official website

French rappers
1976 births
Living people
French people of Nigerian descent
French people of Yoruba descent
Yoruba musicians
People from Clichy, Hauts-de-Seine